XEGEM-AM is a radio station in Metepec, State of Mexico, Mexico on 1600 AM, owned by the government of the State of Mexico. It is part of the Radio Mexiquense state radio network and is its flagship on AM, broadcasting to the state capital of Toluca.

XEGEM signed on May 18, 1983 along with XETUL-AM 1080 in Tultitlán, XETEJ-AM 1250 in Tejupilco and XEATL-AM 1520 in Atlacomulco (now XHATL-FM 105.5).

In 1984, television station XHGEM-TV took to air, and in 2002, XHGEM-FM 91.7 came to air. XEGEM and XHGEM FM have separate program schedules.

References

1983 establishments in Mexico
Public radio in Mexico
Radio stations established in 1983
Radio stations in the State of Mexico
Spanish-language radio stations